Parrisia is an extinct genus of legless batrachosauroidid salamander from Campanian-age rocks in the Marshalltown Formation, Monmouth County, New Jersey. The type and only species is Parrisia neocesariensis, which was discovered at the Ellisdale Fossil Site in New Jersey.

References

Cretaceous salamanders
Cretaceous amphibians of North America
Late Cretaceous amphibians
Fossil taxa described in 1998